Rest in peace (R.I.P.), a phrase from the Latin , is sometimes used in traditional Christian services and prayers, such as in the Catholic, Lutheran, Anglican, and Methodist denominations, to wish the soul of a decedent eternal rest and peace.

It became ubiquitous on headstones in the 18th century, and is widely used today when mentioning someone's death.

Description
The phrase dormit in pace (English: "[he] sleeps in peace") was found in the catacombs of the early Christians and indicated that "they died in the peace of the Church, that is, united in Christ." The abbreviation R.I.P., meaning Requiescat in pace, "Rest in peace", continues to be engraved on the gravestones of Christians, especially in the Catholic, Lutheran, and Anglican denominations.

In the Tridentine Requiem Mass of the Catholic Church the phrase appears several times.

Other variations include "Requiescat in pace et in amore" for "[May he/she] rest in peace and love", and "In pace requiescat et in amore".  The word order is variable because Latin syntactical relationships are indicated by the inflexional endings, not by word order.  If "Rest in peace" is used in an imperative mood, it would be "Requiesce in pace" (acronym R.I.P.) in the second person singular, or "Requiescite in pace" in the second person plural. In the common phrase "Requiescat in pace" the "-at" ending is appropriate because the verb is a third-person singular present active subjunctive used in a hortative sense: "[May he/she] rest in peace."

History

The phrase was first found on tombstones some time before the fifth century. It became ubiquitous on the tombs of Christians in the 18th century, and for High Church Anglicans, Methodists, as well as Roman Catholics in particular, it was a prayerful request that their soul should find peace in the afterlife. When the phrase became conventional, the absence of a reference to the soul led people to suppose that it was the physical body that was enjoined to lie peacefully in the grave. This is associated with the Christian doctrine of the particular judgment; that is, that the soul is parted from the body upon death, but that the soul and body will be reunited on Judgment Day.

Use in various religions

Irish Protestantism
In 2017, members of the Orange Order in Northern Ireland called on Protestants to stop using the phrase "RIP" or "Rest in Peace". Wallace Thompson, the secretary of the Evangelical Protestant Society, said on a BBC Radio Ulster programme that he would encourage Protestants to refrain from using the term "RIP". Thompson said that he regards "RIP" as a prayer for the dead, which he believes contradicts biblical doctrine. In the same radio programme, Presbyterian Ken Newell disagreed that people are praying for the dead when they use the phrase.

Judaism

The expression "rest in peace" is "not commonly used in Jewish contexts", though some commentators say that it is "consistent with Jewish practice". The traditional Hebrew expression , literally 'may peace be upon him', is sometimes rendered in English as 'may he rest in peace'. On the other hand, some Jews object to using the phrase for Jews, considering it to reflect a Christian perspective.

Image gallery

See also

 Rest in power
 Eternal Rest
 Allhallowtide
 Honorifics for the dead in Judaism
 Sit tibi terra levis
 From God We Came, From God We Return
 List of Latin phrases

References

Death customs
English-language idioms
Modern Latin inscriptions
Christian terminology